Marc Ferland (born 15 April 1942 in Quebec City, Quebec) was a Progressive Conservative member of the House of Commons of Canada. He was an industrial designer and project coordinator by career.

Ferland's post-secondary education was at the Commercial and Industrial institute of Quebec. In politics, he represented the Quebec riding of Portneuf where he was first elected in the 1984 federal election and re-elected in 1988, therefore becoming a member in the 33rd and 34th Canadian Parliaments.

Ferland left federal politics when he was defeated in the 1993 federal election by Pierre de Savoye of the Bloc Québécois.

References

External links
 

1942 births
French Quebecers
Living people
Members of the House of Commons of Canada from Quebec
Politicians from Quebec City
Progressive Conservative Party of Canada MPs